Chandan Hajuri (20 January 1827 – 1870) popularly known as 'Chakhi Khuntia' was a Jagannath Temple priest and a poet who participated in the Indian Rebellion of 1857.

Life
Chandan Hajuri was born on the auspicious day of Samba Dashami in the year 1827 which fell on 7 January 1827 in Puri of Odisha to father Raghunath Khuntia alias Bhimasen Hajuri and mother Kamalabati. He was married to Sundarmani at the Age of 12. At a young age, he was taught Odia, Sanskrit and Hindi literature to help him perform his duties in the Jagannath temple. He also learned traditional wrestling at Akharas and later, taught Wrestling and military exercises to the youths in Puri.

1857 Rebellion
Chakhi Khuntia happened to be the family priest of Manubai, later renamed Lakshmibai after her marriage to Gangadhar Rao, the King of Jhansi. He played a crucial role in mobilizing the sepoys and organizing mutiny while traveling across the country as a Panda of the Jagannath Temple before the Indian Rebellion of 1857. At the time of the mutiny, he was stationed at a Northern Military Station and fought valiantly with the British.He was known to have maintained a direct contact with the rebel leadership during the Mutiny. Later, he was arrested in Gaya and his properties were confiscated by the East Indian Company Government.
In 1858, Hajuri was released from prison after being offered amnesty under the Queen's proclamation of 1858 along with other Rebels.

Later life
Khuntia spent the remainder of his life at Puri by devoting himself to spiritual and literary pursuits. He composed several popular Poems and Songs dedicated to Jagannath. He also composed a palm life manuscript titled Manubai in memory of Lakshmibai. He died in 1870 at Puri.

References

19th-century Indian people
People from Odisha
Indian revolutionaries
1827 births
1870 deaths
Revolutionaries of the Indian Rebellion of 1857